Mutant X is a comic book published by Marvel Comics between 1998 and 2001, featuring Havok, a mutant and former member of the X-Men, who is transported into a parallel dimension. It was written by Howard Mackie and inked by Andrew Pepoy, with a series of different pencilers.

The "Mutant X" universe (Earth-1298) is a reimagination of the Earth-616 universe. In this continuum, Scott Summers was captured along with his parents by the Shi'ar and only Alex (Havok) escaped, allowing him to be the eventual leader of the X-Men. Originally, the highlighted difference between the Mutant X universe and Earth-616 was that mutants have come to be accepted by the overwhelming majority of humanity, and anti-mutant sentiments are regarded as outdated. However, a retcon in Mutant X #15 asserts that hatred against mutants is even stronger than in Earth-616, and that Havok had simply failed to notice this. Another significant difference in the Mutant X universe is that the mutant gene is not present at conception, and instead appears due to random gene mutations that can happen at any age.

Publication history
Mutant X was originally intended to be a 12-issue limited series, but due to unexpectedly high sales it was extended to an ongoing series. The series lasted for 32 issues and three annuals before it ended.

Plot
After Greystone, a member of Havok's X-Factor team, develops temporal insanity, he attempts to build a time machine to return to his timeline and be reunited with his mother who, in all probability, does not exist anymore. Havok attempts to stop him, but the machine explodes, supposedly killing both men. However, at the instant of Havok's death, a Havok from an alternate reality also dies after being shot in the chest by a Sentinel. Havok's spirit finds its way into his counterpart's body and he wakes up in the Mutant X Universe. Here, he is the leader of a mutant team of heroes dubbed The Six (who are altered versions of his friends from Earth-616), the husband of Madelyne Pryor, and the father of Scotty Summers.

At first he tries to convince the others of the Six to help him return to his universe, but they all still believe him to be the Havok of their universe and insist that he is lying about coming from another dimension as a way of getting back at Madelyne for some unspecified injury. Havok ultimately gives up and decides to take on his counterpart's place in this universe. Only Scotty, who has precognitive powers, realizes that Havok is telling the truth, and addresses him as "Alex" instead of "Dad". The two quickly form a bond.

A demon-possessed Madelyne sets plans to take over the world into play. She takes control of all the members of the Six except Havok. Scotty is warned of her doings by his precognitive power, and Havok takes him and his nanny, Elektra, into hiding. For months Madelyne wages war against the rest of the world while trying to open a gateway to allow a full demonic invasion. Scotty finally stops her by exorcising the Goblin Entity from her mind.

The destruction caused by Madelyne serves as a spark to ignite the seething anti-mutant sentiment in the United States, and new president Graydon Creed tasks terrorist leader Nick Fury with rounding up mutants into prison camps; though the public explanation is that this is for their protection, mutants taken into the camps are immediately killed. Havok has Elektra take Scotty into hiding, while the remaining members of the Six, supplemented by new members Gambit and Captain America, set about rescuing mutants from Nick Fury's troops.

At the end of the series, the Goblin Entity, Dracula and the Beyonder all converge their efforts to destroy Earth. Almost all of the heroes die in the epic battle. Havok, discovering that he is the home for the Nexus of Realities, a force of nature that binds all realities (Omniverse), uses it to wield an omniversal level of power to stop the Goblin Entity, which had merged with the Beyonder. He then fights with the possessed Maydelyne and harnesses the power of the Nexus of All realities and with a thought eliminates the Goblin Entity throughout the Omniverse. He then teleports Maydelyne to her alternate universe with her son, Scotty. Fearing that somebody would attempt to use the power of the Nexus of All Realities to reshape, destroy, or alter the very Omniverse; he then becomes one with the Nexus of All Realities to prevent anyone from getting this power, except himself.

Revisitation
The Mutant X Havok did not die during the fight with the Sentinels. He was instead thrown into unconsciousness while the Earth-616 Havok took over his body. The evil Havok went with the original Havok back to Earth-616 during the final battle with the Goblin Queen. He lay dormant when Charles Xavier freed Alex's consciousness, biding his time, and re-emerged after Xavier Institute Student Nicholas Gleason (Wolf Cub) wounded Havok.  Luckily, the Exiles (Mimic, Magik, Heather Hudson, Nocturne, Morph and Sunfire) were sent by the Timebroker to fight off the evil Alex until the Earth-616 version came back. The Timebroker then personally eliminated the evil Alex's consciousness.

Characters
 Alex Summers/Havok: Transplanted from Earth-616 to the Mutant X universe, Alex finds himself thrust into the role of his other-dimensional counterpart. His sole confident in the Mutant X universe is his counterpart's son, Scotty, and he dedicates himself to protecting him.
 Scotty Summers: The son of Havok and Marvel Woman. He has immensely powerful sensory and precognitive abilities, and is the only person to realize that Alex is not lying when he says he is from an alternate universe. Despite knowing this, he instinctively trusts Alex and even comes to regard him as a surrogate father. His powers are such that he singlehandedly puts an end to the Goblin Queen's conquest of Earth.
 Elektra: A highly trained ninja, Elektra Stavros serves as a nanny for Scotty.
 Dracula: Dracula's coffin is held in a special cell in the Vault until it is broken out by the Marauders.  He proceeds to go on a killing rampage before being killed by Storm.
 Magneto: Magneto became friends with Professor X and they formed the X-Men. Following Professor X becoming possessed by the Shadow King, Magneto became the leader of the X-Men.
 Nick Fury: Leader of S.H.I.E.L.D. (Saviors of Humanity by Intervention in the Evolution of Life-form Deviants), an outlaw terrorist group dedicated to exterminating all superpowered humans. S.H.I.E.L.D. is reinstated by President Graydon Creed to hunt down mutants.

The Six
At the beginning of the series, Havok is the leader of The Six, a superhero group which is roughly equivalent to the Earth-616 original X-Men. The roster includes:

Collected editions

References

External links
 Uncannyxmen.net issue summaries for the entire Mutant X series

Marvel Comics titles
X-Men titles
Marvel Comics superhero teams